Bardo is a concept of a transitional state in Buddhism.

Bardo may also refer to:

Arts and entertainment 
Bardo (2016 film), a short film
Bardo (2018 film), an Indian drama film
Bardo, False Chronicle of a Handful of Truths, a 2022 Mexican drama film
Bardo (band), a group that represented the United Kingdom in the Eurovision Song Contest in 1982
Bardo (album), 1981 album by Peter Michael Hamel

Places

Le Bardo, a suburb of Tunis
Treaty of Bardo (1881), a treaty between France and Tunisia
Bardo National Museum (Tunis) of antiquities 
Bardo Palace, site of both the museum and the Assembly of the Representatives of the People of Tunisia
Bardo National Museum (Algiers), a national museum in Algeria
Bardo, Alberta, a locale in Canada
Bardo, Kentucky, a settlement in the US
Bardo, Poland, a town in Lower Silesia
Bardo, Świętokrzyskie Voivodeship (south-central Poland)
Bardo, Greater Poland Voivodeship (west-central Poland)
Bardu, a municipality in Norway (previously spelled "Bardo")
Bardo, Slovene name for Lusevera, a commune in Italy

Other uses
Bardo (surname) (including a list of people with the name)
Bardo (bishop) (died 1051), Archbishop of Mainz
Bardo (truck), a pick-up truck manufactured by Iran Khodro

See also
Bardo Thodol, a Tibetan funerary text
Bardos (disambiguation)
Bardot (disambiguation)
Bardon (disambiguation)
Bardu (disambiguation)